Crawford Township may refer to the following places in the United States:

Arkansas
 Crawford Township, Washington County, Arkansas
 Crawford Township, Yell County, Arkansas, in Yell County, Arkansas
Iowa
 Crawford Township, Madison County, Iowa
 Crawford Township, Washington County, Iowa
Kansas
 Crawford Township, Cherokee County, Kansas
 Crawford Township, Crawford County, Kansas
Missouri
 Crawford Township, Buchanan County, Missouri
 Crawford Township, Osage County, Missouri
Nebraska
 Crawford Township, Antelope County, Nebraska
North Carolina
 Crawford Township, Currituck County, North Carolina, in Currituck County, North Carolina
North Dakota
 Crawford Township, Slope County, North Dakota, in Slope County, North Dakota
Ohio
 Crawford Township, Coshocton County, Ohio
 Crawford Township, Wyandot County, Ohio
Pennsylvania
 Crawford Township, Clinton County, Pennsylvania

Township name disambiguation pages